"Loveship" is a collaboration single by South Korean singers Paul Kim and Chungha released on January 21, 2020, by MNH Entertainment and Neuron Music and distributed by Kakao M. The acoustic version was released on January 29, 2020.

Background
On January 13, 2020, Paul Kim and Chungha revealed details about the collaboration they have been working on since the end of 2019. Music and photo teasers were released before the official release of the single.

Composition
The R&B song was written and composed by Paul Kim and arranged by Joseph K. The lyrics are about the struggles of two people not being able to express their love for each other.

Music video
The music video was directed by HOBIN and released on January 21, 2020.

Awards and nominations

Charts

Release history

References

2020 songs
2020 singles
Chungha songs
MNH Entertainment singles
Kakao M singles
Korean-language songs